A Responsible Plan to End the War in Iraq is a 36-page plan that was created by a group of United States Democratic congressional candidates, retired military officers and national security professionals that outlined policy measures (consisting of bills that were before the United States Congress at the time of its writing) that the candidates pledged to support in the 2008 elections.

The plan's stated proposals with respect to Iraq were: drawing down U.S. military involvement in Iraq, development of a permanent nation-building capability in the Department of State, a large infusion of foreign aid into Iraq, a transfer of responsibility to the international community through dialogue, addressing refugee issues, creation of an independent war crimes commission, and funding of education to improve the status of women.

With respect to American domestic politics, the proposals were to ban Presidential signing statements, require treatment in accordance with the Geneva Conventions and habeas corpus rights for all prisoners, allow potential surveillance targets to sue the government pre-emptively for injunctive relief, prohibit rendition, increase benefits for veterans, reduce defense contracting, and address energy issues.

Background
On March 20, 2003, the United States invaded Iraq leading a multinational coalition that included British troops as well as smaller contingents from Australia, Denmark, Poland, and other nations.

Since the beginning of the war there had been great debate about how it should end. The plan cited a number of facts and events as the foundation for its existence, including the following:

In November 2006, voters elected a new Democratic Party majority in both the Senate and the House of Representatives in the 110th Congress, largely with the expectation that they would work to reduce or end American military involvement in Iraq.
In December 2006 the Iraq Study Group (ISG), a ten-person bipartisan panel appointed on March 15, 2006 by Congress, released their final report.  Also known as the Baker-Hamilton Commission, the ISG was charged with assessing the situation in Iraq and the US-led Iraq War and making policy recommendations. While President George W. Bush praised the ISG's efforts, he rejected many of its recommendations.
In March 2007, General David Petraeus, Commanding General of the Multi-National Force in Iraq, claimed that there was "no military solution" in Iraq, and that political negotiations were crucial to forging any lasting peace.
By March 2008, the number of U.S. military personnel killed in Iraq had reached 4,000, with many thousands more wounded, and an estimated hundreds of thousands of Iraqi casualties.
Also by March 2008, the financial cost of the Iraq War to the United States had surpassed the half trillion dollar mark.

Germination
On August 27, 2007, President Bush made a fundraising visit to Bellevue, Washington in support of  Republican Representative Dave Reichert. In response, Reichert's main opponent, Democratic candidate Darcy Burner, organized a "virtual town hall" meeting to discuss the situation in Iraq. The town hall meeting was streamed live online and included testimonials from Ambassador Joe Wilson and retired Major General Paul Eaton, former Security Transition Commanding General in Iraq, and the participation of Jon Soltz, chairman of VoteVets.org, and retired Navy Captain Larry Seaquist, among others. In a statement following the event, Darcy Burner wrote:

Unveiling
On March 17, 2008 at the Take Back America conference in Washington, D.C., Darcy Burner (WA-08) was joined by five other congressional candidates Donna Edwards, Chellie Pingree, Tom Perriello, Sam Bennett and Jared Polis for the unveiling of A Responsible Plan to End the War in Iraq, a 36-page document that was the culmination of the six-month effort.

Endorsers
Two days after the initial unveiling, Rand Beers, a counterterrorism expert who served on the National Security Council under Presidents Ronald Reagan, George H. W. Bush and Bill Clinton added his endorsement. Within one week, the plan had received the endorsement of an additional 24 Democratic challengers, and as of July 2008 it had 58 House and Senate candidate endorsements, and over 50,000 individual endorsers.

Contents

Outline
The two main strategic questions the plan sought to answer were:

 How to bring American military engagement in Iraq to a responsible end?
 How to prevent a repeat of mistakes that have been made?

The plan attempted to present a combined military, diplomatic, and economic strategy to end the war in Iraq. It cited various ISG recommendations and listed a number of existing, but stalled bills in Congress that addressed multiple areas of focus.

Objectives
The plan broke down the areas of focus into several categories:

 Ending U.S. military action in Iraq.(per ISG recommendations 22, 40, 41 and 42)
 Increasing the use of U.S. diplomatic power and refocusing anti-terrorism measures.(per ISG recommendations 1 and 2)
 Addressing Iraqi economic reconstruction and regional humanitarian concerns.
 Restoring governmental transparency and accountability, and constitutional rights.
 Restoring the U.S. military and supporting veterans.
 Restoring independence to the media.
 Creating a new, U.S.-centered energy policy.(per ISG recommendation 23).

Iraq Study Group recommendations
In support of the stated objectives, the plan referenced seven recommendations from the final report of the Iraq Study Group.

Legislation
The plan categorized fifteen bills that had been introduced in both the House or Senate during the 110th Congress that addressed the various objectives of the plan. By February 2009, most of them had been referred to subcommittees, only three had been voted on in the House, and none had yet been enacted into law.

Views about the plan
The plan received national press and attention following its unveiling. Ilan Goldenberg, Policy Director at the National Security Network, writing in The New Republic, called it "thoughtful", "a good first step" and "welcome progress". Arianna Huffington at Huffington Post referred to it as "A Contract to Restore America".  The plan was also mentioned on ABC's This Week with George Stephanopoulos. Katrina vanden Heuvel, publisher of The Nation magazine, called the plan "responsible", saying "there are no military solutions". However, Political commentator Cokie Roberts stated that withdrawal from Iraq, one of the goals of the plan, would be "an irresponsible thing to do", claiming "Americans would prefer to win".  There were also indications that, within the Democratic Party, the plan had some influence in the debate, with the plan cited on the House floor in 2008. and "helped focus" actions in the House according to Speaker Nancy Pelosi speaking about the plan and Burner's efforts in a June 2008 interview.

While the plan received support from the liberal blogosphere and grassroots organizations, such as OpenLeft and Daily Kos, it was panned and received criticism from Republicans in Congress and other conservative commentators.  Dave Reichert, Congressman for Washington's 8th district said, through his spokesman, that he believed "military leaders on the ground – not candidates for political office – should make decisions about when and how to end the war".  Reichert's spokesman also suggested that "it would be irresponsible to withdraw troops and then send U.S. money 'into a black hole.'"

References

External links

A Responsible Plan to End the War in Iraq
A Responsible Plan to End the War in Iraq full text (PDF)
The Iraq Study Group Report full text (PDF)

Occupation of Iraq
Iraq–United States relations
War on terror
Political plans in the United States
2008 in American politics